Feng Bin (born 3 April 1994) is a Chinese track and field athlete who competes in the discus throw. She represented her country at the 2016 Rio Olympics, finishing eighth in the final. She was the 2016 winner of the Chinese Athletics Championships.

She began discus throwing in her early teens and competed at the World Youth Championships in Athletics in 2011, placing fourth. Feng broke through at senior level with a gold medal win at the 2015 Military World Games in a personal best of 62.07 m. At the 2016 Summer Olympics she was one of three Chinese throwers to make the discus final, alongside medallist Su Xinyue and Chen Yang.

International competitions

References

External links

Living people
1994 births
Chinese female discus throwers
Olympic athletes of China
Athletes (track and field) at the 2016 Summer Olympics
Athletes (track and field) at the 2018 Asian Games
Asian Games silver medalists for China
Asian Games medalists in athletics (track and field)
Medalists at the 2018 Asian Games
Asian Athletics Championships winners
Athletes (track and field) at the 2020 Summer Olympics
21st-century Chinese women